Dendroconche scandens, synonym Microsorum scandens, commonly called fragrant fern, is a species of fern within the family Polypodiaceae. This species is native to parts of New Zealand and Australia, as well as some offshore islands (Chatham Island, Lord Howe Island and Norfolk Island). It has been introduced to South Africa and Zimbabwe. An example occurrence in New Zealand's North Island is in the Hamilton Ecological District where it is associated with a number of other ferns including Icarus filiforme and Lomaria discolor.

References

 C. Michael Hogan. 2009. Crown Fern: Blechnum discolor, Globaltwitcher.com, ed. N. Stromberg
 D.J. Mabberley. 2008. Mabberley's plant-book: a portable dictionary of plants, their classification and uses, third edition, revised, Cambridge University Press, 1021 pages

Polypodiaceae
Ferns of New Zealand
Ferns of Australia
Flora of Queensland
Flora of New South Wales
Flora of Lord Howe Island
Flora of the Chatham Islands
Flora of Norfolk Island
Flora of Victoria (Australia)